Denomination may refer to:

 Religious denomination, such as a:
 Christian denomination
 Jewish denomination
 Islamic denomination
 Hindu denominations
 Buddhist denomination
 Denomination (currency)
 Denomination (postage stamp)
 Protected designation of origin, a protected product name, usually by region of production